Hopping Hill is an area in Milford, Derbyshire, England. It consists mainly of 19th century terraced housing, built by the Strutt family to house workers from the local cotton mills. The church of Holy Trinity and the War Memorial are at the junction of Hopping Hill and the A6 road. It is in the town of Belper.

Villages in Derbyshire
Geography of Amber Valley